Alex King (born February 20, 1985) is a German former professional basketball player. He is the all-time leader of games played in the Basketball Bundesliga, with 638 appearances.

Professional career
On July 8, 2013, he signed a three-year contract with German team Alba Berlin.

On August 19, 2016, he signed a contract with Bayern Munich for the 2016–17 season, including a team option for the 2017–18 season.

On December 11, 2020, he has loaned to s.Oliver Würzburg of Basketball Bundesliga (BBL) until the end of the season.

In September of 2021, it was confirmed that King would be loaned to s.Oliver Würzburg for another season. 

At the end of 2021–22 season, King decided to retire from professional basketball.

References

External links
 BBL Profile
 Eurocup Profile
 Eurobasket.com Profile

1985 births
Living people
Alba Berlin players
FC Bayern Munich basketball players
German men's basketball players
German sportspeople of Nigerian descent
People from Ansbach
Sportspeople from Middle Franconia
Power forwards (basketball)
S.Oliver Würzburg players
Skyliners Frankfurt players
Small forwards
Telekom Baskets Bonn players